This is a list of the 14 Governorates of Syria by Human Development Index as of 2023 with data for the year 2021.

See also 

 List of countries by Human Development Index

References 

Syria
Syria
Human Development Index
Human Development Index